Ponerorchis lepida (synonym Amitostigma lepidum) is a species of plant in the family Orchidaceae found on Kyushu Island in Japan, and in Nansei-shoto (Ryukyu Islands) to the south.

Taxonomy
The species was first described by Heinrich Gustav Reichenbach in 1878, as Gymnadenia lepida. It has been placed in various genera, including Gymnadenia, Orchis and Amitostigma. A molecular phylogenetic study in 2014, in which it was included as Amitostigma lepidum, found that species of Amitostigma, Neottianthe and Ponerorchis were mixed together in a single clade, making none of the three genera monophyletic as then circumscribed. Amitostigma and Neottianthe were subsumed into Ponerorchis, with this species becoming Ponerorchis lepida.

References

External links 
 

lepida
Orchids of Japan
Flora of the Ryukyu Islands
Plants described in 1878